Ano Kleines (before 1926: Άνω Κλέστινα - Ano Klestina) is a village in Florina Regional Unit, Macedonia, Greece.

Muslims of Ano Klestina were Albanian speakers. The Greek census (1920) recorded 911 people in the village and in 1923 there were 896 inhabitants (or 147 families) who were Muslim. Following the Greek-Turkish population exchange, in 1926 within Ano Klestina there were refugee families from East Thrace (72), Asia Minor (13), Pontus (4) and one other from an unidentified location. The Greek census (1928) recorded 584 village inhabitants. In 1928, there were 85 refugee families (381 people). A Muslim school existed in the village until 1924, later destroyed.

Ano Kleines had 236 inhabitants in 1981. In fieldwork done by Riki Van Boeschoten in late 1993, Ano Kleines was populated by  a Greek population descended from Anatolian Greek refugees who arrived during the Greek-Turkish population exchange, and Slavophones. The Macedonian language was spoken by people over 60, mainly in private.

References 

Populated places in Florina (regional unit)